KXQQ-FM (100.5 MHz) is a commercial radio station located in Henderson, Nevada, broadcasting in the Las Vegas, Nevada area.  KXQQ-FM airs a rhythmic hot AC format, billed as "Q100.5."  Owned by Audacy, Inc., the station's studios are located in the unincorporated Clark County area of Spring Valley, while KXQQ-FM's transmitter is atop Black Mountain in Henderson.

KXQQ-FM broadcasts in HD:
HD1 is a digital version of the KXQQ-FM over-the-air traditional (analog) broadcast.
HD2 is a dance format known as "Sin 100.5".
HD3 is a hip hop format known as "100.5 Jamz".

History

Early years (1981-1995) 
The station officially signed on on October 26, 1981, with the call letters KMZQ. KMZQ went through many changes over its 12-year run. KMZQ was known as "Q-100" and "Klassy 100".

Adult contemporary (1995-2005) 
From 1995 to 2005, it was known as "Lite 100.5 FM."

Jack FM (2005-2010) 
On June 24, 2005, at 2 p.m., after playing "Leaving Las Vegas" by Sheryl Crow, KMZQ began stunting with Christmas music; 45 minutes later, the stunt shifted to movie theme songs with the sound of a Roulette wheel in between. At 3 p.m., the stunt ended with the station's new voiceover artist Howard Cogan asking to "please cut the cheesy Roulette wheel sound effect", and declaring that Vegas needed a new radio station, as well as revealing that he was the new "operator" of the station, winning it in a poker match from "some guy named Joel" (most likely a reference to then-CEO of Infinity Broadcasting Joel Hollander). Shortly thereafter, "Lite 100.5" became Jack FM, with a variety hits format. The call letters were quickly changed to KKJJ. The first song on "Jack FM" was The Flying Lizards' cover of "Money (That's What I Want)". KMZQ-FM's call letters would be moved to a station on 99.3 FM in Payson, Arizona, co-owned with KMZQ (670 AM) in Las Vegas Valley.

News/talk (2010-2015) 
In July 2010, CBS Radio announced that starting on August 16, 2010, KKJJ would be replaced with a simulcast of sister station KXNT and would be known as Newsradio 840 AM/100.5 FM KXNT. On August 16, at 5:03 p.m., after playing "Talk Talk" by Talk Talk, KKJJ began simulcasting KXNT. With the change, the station changed call letters to KXNT-FM. The lineup included The Wall Street Journal Report, Las Vegas' Morning News, and Jim Villanuccia. Syndicated programs included Rush Limbaugh, Dave Ramsey, Clyde Lewis and Coast to Coast AM.

Rhythmic (2015-present) 
On September 4, 2015, at 9 a.m., after stunting for an hour with songs from multiple genres and liners redirecting KXNT listeners to 840 AM, KXNT-FM flipped to Rhythmic Hot AC as "Q100.5." Billing itself as "Today's Rhythm & All The Best Old School," the station is positioned between sister stations KMXB and KLUC in targeting a 25-49 audience while trying to upstage another upstart that also debuted the same day, KPLV-HD2/K280DD, who launched an Urban Contemporary format billed as "Real 103.9" to serve as a flanker for KPLV and to draw listeners away from KLUC and KVEG. In addition, KXNT will also have competition against another Rhythmic AC outlet, KOAS. The first song on "Q100.5" was "This Is How We Do It" by Montell Jordan. The station changed to its current KXQQ-FM call sign on September 28, 2015.

On February 2, 2017, CBS Radio announced it would merge with Entercom. The merger was approved on November 9, 2017, and was consummated on November 17.

Former logos

References

External links

XQQ-FM
Rhythmic adult contemporary radio stations
KXQQ-FM
Radio stations established in 1982
1982 establishments in Nevada
Audacy, Inc. radio stations